Trissolcus is a genus of parasitoid wasps in the family Platygastridae. There are at least 180 described species in Trissolcus. They parasitize eggs of Pentatomorpha.

Species
These species belong to the genus Trissolcus:

 Trissolcus alpestris (Kieffer, 1909) g
 Trissolcus ancon Johnson, 1991 g
Trissolcus arctatus Johnson, 1991 i
 Trissolcus arminon (Walker, 1838) g
 Trissolcus asperlineatus (Mineo & Szabo, 1981) g
 Trissolcus barrowi (Dodd) g
 Trissolcus basalis (Wollaston, 1858) c g i
 Trissolcus belenus (Walker, 1836) g
 Trissolcus biroi (Szabo, 1965) g
 Trissolcus bodkini Crawford g
 Trissolcus brochymenae (Ashmead) g b
 Trissolcus cantus Kozlov & Le, 1977 g
 Trissolcus carinifrons Cameron g
 Trissolcus choaspes (Nixon, 1939) g
 Trissolcus circus Kozlov & Le, 1976 g
 Trissolcus cirrosus Johnson, 1991 i
 Trissolcus cosmopeplae Gahan g
Trissolcus crypticus Clarke, 1993 i
 Trissolcus cultratus Mayr g
 Trissolcus davatchii (Javahery, 1968) g
 Trissolcus discolor (Ratzeburg, 1848) g
 Trissolcus djadetshko (Ryakhovskii, 1959) g
 Trissolcus dryope (Kozlov & Le, 1976) g
 Trissolcus edessae Fouts, 1920 b
 Trissolcus eetion (Dodd, 1914) i
 Trissolcus egeria (Dodd, 1914) i
 Trissolcus elasmuchae (Watanabe, 1954) g
 Trissolcus ephyra (Dodd, 1914) i
 Trissolcus eriventus Le g
 Trissolcus euander (Dodd, 1914) i
 Trissolcus eurydemae (Vasiliev, 1915) g
 Trissolcus euschisti (Ashmead, 1893) g b
 Trissolcus evanescens Kieffer, 1904 g
 Trissolcus exerrandus Kozlov & Le g
 Trissolcus festivae (Viktorov, 1964) g
 Trissolcus flaviscapus Dodd, 1916 g i
 Trissolcus fulmeki (Soyka, 1942) g
 Trissolcus ghorfii (Delucchi & Voegelé, 1961) g
 Trissolcus gonopsidis Watanabe g
 Trissolcus grandis (Thomson, 1860) g
 Trissolcus hullensis Harrington g
 Trissolcus japonicus (Ashmead, 1904) g
 Trissolcus hyalinipennis Rajmohana & Narendran g
 Trissolcus kozlovi Ryakhovskii, 1975 g
 Trissolcus lampe (Kozlov & Le, 1976) g
 Trissolcus larides Nixon g
 Trissolcus latisulcus (Crawford, 1913) g i
 Trissolcus leviventris Cameron g
 Trissolcus lodosi (Szabo, 1981) g
 Trissolcus manteroi (Kieffer, 1909) g
 Trissolcus maori Johnson, 1991 c g i
 Trissolcus mitsukurii Ashmead g i
 Trissolcus mopsus Nixon g
 Trissolcus oedipus (Dodd, 1913) i
 Trissolcus oeneus (Dodd, 1913) i
 Trissolcus oenone (Dodd, 1913) c g i
 Trissolcus oenopion (Dodd, 1913) i
 Trissolcus ogyges (Dodd, 1913) i
 Trissolcus oobius (Kozlov, 1972) g
 Trissolcus pentatomae (Rondani, 1877) g
 Trissolcus perepelovi Kozlov g
 Trissolcus perrisi (Kieffer, 1906) g
 Trissolcus personatus Johnson, 1991 g i
 Trissolcus plautiae Watanabe g
 Trissolcus pseudoturesis (Ryakhovskii, 1959) g
 Trissolcus rufiventris (Mayr, 1907) g
 Trissolcus saakowi Mayr g
 Trissolcus schimitscheki (Szelenyi, 1942) g
 Trissolcus scutellaris (Thomson, 1861) g
 Trissolcus semistriatus (Nees, 1834) g
 Trissolcus simoni (Mayr, 1879) g
 Trissolcus stoicus Nixon g
 Trissolcus strigis Johnson, 1991 i
 Trissolcus tersus Le g
 Trissolcus theste (Walker, 1838) g
 Trissolcus trophonius Nixon g
 Trissolcus tumidus (Mayr, 1879) g
 Trissolcus utahensis Ashmead g
 Trissolcus vassilliewi (Mayr, 1879) g
 Trissolcus vesta Kozlov & Le g
 Trissolcus viktorovi Kozlov, 1968 g
 Trissolcus vindicius Nixon g
 Trissolcus volgensis (Viktorov, 1964) g
 Trissolcus waloffae (Javahery, 1968) g
 Trissolcus yamagishii Ryu g

Data sources: i = ITIS, c = Catalogue of Life, g = GBIF, b = Bugguide.net i = IRMNG

References

Further reading

External links

 

Parasitic wasps
Platygastridae